Harold Orlob (3 June 1883 – 25 June 1982) was a native of Logan, Utah who became a major composer and lyricist for Broadway theatre productions.

He composed his best-known song "I Wonder Who's Kissing Her Now" in 1909, with lyrics by Will M. Hough and Frank R. Adams, selling the song to Joseph E. Howard.  When the song unexpectedly became a hit, Howard presented it as his own work for several years.

Orlob became a prolific composer for Broadway.  Among his works were the short run of Corianton: An Aztec Lovestory, a work pushed through by Orestes U. Bean's salesmanship and based on the novel Corianton by B. H. Roberts.  His most successful show was Listen Lester, which ran for 272 performances between 1918 and 1919.  It included the song "Waiting," recorded by several artists of that era.

In 1939 Orlob produced the film ...One Third of a Nation....  Returning to Broadway musicals, in 1943 he produced Hairpin Harmony which would become a legendary flop, closing after three performances.  He continued to write songs as well as a symphonic work, Recreation.

In 1947 "I Wonder Who's Kissing Her Now" was used as the title song of a movie about Joe Howard, leading to renewed popularity for the song.  At this time Orlob brought suit to declare himself the composer, eventually reaching an out-of-court settlement with Howard for the two of them to receive joint credit.  Orlob did not claim royalties.

References

External links
Harold Orlob Papers

1883 births
1982 deaths
People from Logan, Utah
American male composers
American composers
American Latter Day Saints
American male songwriters
Songwriters from Utah
20th-century American male musicians